William Paul McClure Kennedy (January 8, 1879August 12, 1963) was a Canadian historian and legal scholar.

Early life and education 
Kennedy was born in Shankill, Dublin, on January 8, 1879. He graduated from Trinity College Dublin in 1900 with an MA and LittD. Kennedy came to Canada from Ireland in 1913, taking up a post at St. Francis Xavier University. He moved to the University of Toronto in 1915, teaching history, politics, and constitutional law.

Academic career 
Kennedy founded the University of Toronto Law Journal in 1935, editing the journal until 1949. Also in 1935, he was named a fellow of the Royal Society of Canada. In 1937, he worked as an advisor to the Rowell–Sirois Commission. Kennedy advised the attorney-general and a parliamentary committee on potential revisions to the British North America Act. He became dean of the University of Toronto Faculty of Law in 1944.

Kennedy's early constitutional scholarship argued against the concept of the nation state as applied in the Canadian context. He followed the views of Lord Acton, who stressed that states formed on the basis of national self-determination put liberty at risk. Instead, he argued in favour of what Carl Berger calls "relative autonomy" for Canada, then a dominion, within the broader British Empire.

Kennedy died on August 12, 1963, in Toronto.

Publications

Further reading

References 

1879 births
1963 deaths
20th-century Canadian historians
Alumni of Trinity College Dublin
Canadian legal scholars
Fellows of the Royal Society of Canada
Irish emigrants to Canada (before 1923)
Academic staff of St. Francis Xavier University
Academic staff of the University of Toronto
Academic staff of the University of Toronto Faculty of Law
Writers from Dublin (city)